Zavala is a village in the Ravno municipality, in Bosnia and Herzegovina.

Geography
The village lies in the south-western part of Popovo polje, in southernmost part of Bosnia and Herzegovina, some 400 metres from the Vjetrenica cave.

Zavala includes the hamlet of Mareva Ljut.

History
Zavala was part of the medieval župa (county) of Popovo, mentioned in a charter issued by Grand Prince Miroslav of Hum to the Church of St. Peter by the Lim river at the end of 12th century. The village of Zavala was mentioned in a 1372 document. In the 14th century, Popovo was governed by the Nikolić noble family, and then the Sanković noble family. Throughout the 15th century, until the region fell to the Ottoman Empire, the Kosača family held possession of Popovo. The Klisura fort was built by the Kosača on the hills above Zavala in the early 15th century.

In the period of 1961–1991, Zavala was the seat of the Zavala municipality.

Culture
Zavala monastery, Serbian Orthodox monastery founded in 1271

Anthropology
The families of Zavala before the Yugoslav wars were the Vukanović, Korać, Čalank, Andrić, Jović, Srba, Šešelj, Tupajić, Turanjanin, Nedić, Vulić. These have mostly left for Trebinje.

Demographics
In the 1991 census, the village itself had 105 inhabitants, of whom 89 were ethnic Serbs, 12 Croats, and 4 Yugoslavs.

According to the 2013 census, its population was 186.

References

External links
rtrs.tv: Огњишта › Дубљани и Завала

Populated places in Ravno, Bosnia and Herzegovina
Villages in the Federation of Bosnia and Herzegovina
Serb communities in the Federation of Bosnia and Herzegovina
Popovo Polje